Snail Mail is a racing video game released by Sandlot Games for Microsoft Windows on December 3, 2004. Versions for Wii, through the WiiWare service, and iOS were released in 2011. The player controls a snail named Turbo, with a jetpack strapped to its back, avoiding various enemies and obstacles.

Gameplay 
The game features the main protagonist, a snail, whose task is to deliver mail throughout various worlds and levels. Set in space, the game features cel shaded graphics. Snail Mail offers three different modes of play; postal mode, time trial mode and challenge mode. The snail (named Turbo, the purple one pictured on the cover art of the game) has to navigate throughout the levels whilst avoiding various enemies and obstacles, using a jetpack which is strapped on to its back. In multiplayer, other players use different colored snails to do the same thing. The levels are filled with powerups, as well as packages that can be collected. There are 50 levels in the game altogether.

Reception 
The game received mixed reviews from critics. A review by Nintendo-video game review site, Nintendo Life on the other hand, praised the art style and the colorful visuals. The same review however, mentioned how awkward the controls in the game were, which impacted on the gameplay. The review also found the levels to be too similar and repetitive to make the game an enjoyable one. In addition to this, the review noted that the graphics occasionally made the game difficult to play, for example the way that the camera in the game moved with the player.

TouchArcade gave the iOS version mostly positive feedback, saying that "everything about the game was fun". IGN also reviewed the iOS version of the game, and gave it in an 8/10.

References

Android (operating system) games
Racing video games
MacOS games
Windows games
iOS games
WiiWare games
2004 video games
2011 video games
Video games developed in the United States
Video games with cel-shaded animation